Baker Creek Falls is a waterfall located at the east end of the city of McMinnville, in Yamhill County, in the U.S. state of Oregon. It is located off Baker Creek Road on the north skirt of Slide Mountain, five miles upstream from Ed Grenfell Park and the Miller Woods Conservation Area. Other waterfalls surround Baker Creek, including Burton Creek Falls, Slide Mountain Falls and Gilbert Creek Falls; all of difficult access or located within private properties.

See also 
 List of waterfalls in Oregon

References 

Waterfalls of Oregon
Parks in Yamhill County, Oregon